Génesis Josianne Romero Fernández (born 6 November 1995) is a Venezuelan athlete specialising in the 100 metres hurdles and long jump. She won the gold medal at the 2018 South American Games.

Her personal best in the event is 13.08 seconds set in Cochabamba in 2018). This is the current national record.

International competitions

Personal bests
100 metres – 11.71 (-0.7 m/s, Barquisimeto 2018)
200 metres – 23.90 (+0.7 m/s, Barquisimeto 2018)
100 metres hurdles – 12.97 (+0.7 m/s, Marseille 2019)
400 metres hurdles – 1:00.14 (Santa Marta 2017)
Long jump – 6.38 (+0.6 m/s, Barinas 2015)

References

1995 births
Living people
Venezuelan female hurdlers
Venezuelan female long jumpers
Athletes (track and field) at the 2015 Pan American Games
Athletes (track and field) at the 2019 Pan American Games
Pan American Games competitors for Venezuela
Athletes (track and field) at the 2018 South American Games
South American Games gold medalists for Venezuela
South American Games medalists in athletics
South American Championships in Athletics winners
South American Games gold medalists in athletics
Competitors at the 2014 Central American and Caribbean Games
Competitors at the 2018 Central American and Caribbean Games
20th-century Venezuelan women
21st-century Venezuelan women